The Communist Party of Iran was an Iranian communist party. Originally established as the Justice Party in 1917 by the former social democrats who supported Baku-based Bolsheviks, it participated in Third International in 1919 and was renamed "Communist Party of Iran" in 1920.

Haydar Khan e Amo-oghli, one of the leaders of the Constitutional Revolution of Iran, was elected as its general secretary. Its foundation came about as a result of the establishment of the Soviet Republic of Gilan, earlier that year, by Mirza Kouchak Khan and his Jangali ("Foresters' Movement") insurgents.

The party was banned in 1921 (coinciding with the defeat of the Soviet Republic of Gilan), though members continued activities underground until the foundation of the Tudeh Party in 1941, which thereafter became the official communist party in the country.

References

Further reading 
 

1917 establishments in Iran
1921 disestablishments in Iran
Banned communist parties
Banned political parties in Iran
Iran
Defunct communist parties in Iran
Iran–Soviet Union relations
Political parties disestablished in 1921
Political parties established in 1917
Political parties in Qajar Iran